Cuneo is a surname of Italian origin. There is a notable family of Italian-descent with the named Cuneo primarily located in San Francisco and London, and many of the members of the family were painters.

The family name Cuneo refers to the following people:
 Andrew Cuneo, American professional Magic: The Gathering player
Anne Cuneo (1936–2015), Swiss journalist, author, and screenwriter
Clorinda Cuneo (1866–1949), American socialite, daughter of businessman Joseph Cuneo and wife of Amadeo Giannini
Cyrus Cuneo (1879–1916), American-born English painter
Ernest Cuneo (born 1906), American lawyer, political advisor, and newspaper owner
Gustave Cunéo d'Ornano (1845–1906), French lawyer, journalist and politician
John Cuneo (sailor) (1928–2020), Australian Olympic sailor
John Cuneo (Illustrator) (born 1957), American illustrator and author
Jonathan Cuneo (born 1952), American lawyer
José Cuneo (born 1965), Argentine comic-book illustrator
José Cuneo Perinetti (1887–1977), Uruguayan painter
Lester Cuneo (1888–1926), American stage and silent-film actor
Michael Cuneo, American engineer
Peter Cuneo (contemporary), American business executive; vice chairman of Marvel Entertainment
Rinaldo Cuneo (1877–1939), American painter; dubbed "the Painter of San Francisco"
Terence Cuneo (1907–1996), English painter

Fictional characters 
Ottilio Cuneo, character from the novel The Godfather; appeared as Carmine Cuneo in the film version

References

Italian-language surnames